Don Ryan was a Democratic Party member of the Montana Senate, representing District 10 since 2000.

External links
Montana Senate - Don Ryan official MT State Legislature website
Project Vote Smart - Senator Don Ryan (MT) profile
Follow the Money - Don Ryan
2006 2004 2000 campaign contributions

Democratic Party Montana state senators
1951 births
Living people